Arkadiusz Miłoszewski (born March 22, 1973) is a Polish professional basketball coach and former national team player. He currently serves as head coach for Wilki Morskie Szczecin of the PLK and as assistant coach for Polish national basketball team.

He played for Poland’s national basketball team from 1994 to 1996.

On September 30, 2021, he has signed as head coach with Wilki Morskie Szczecin of the PLK.

References

External links
 Profile at Basket Zielona Góra website
 Profile at Polish league website
 Player profile at 2004 FIBA Europe League

1973 births
Living people
Basketball players from Warsaw
Centers (basketball)
Forwards (basketball)
Polish basketball coaches
Polish men's basketball players